"That Sound" is a song performed by English musician Sam Fender. The song was released as a digital download on 22 October 2018 by Polydor Records as the fourth single from his debut studio album Hypersonic Missiles. The song was written by Sam Fender and produced by Bramwell Bronte.

Background
The song premiered on Radio 1's ‘Hottest Record in the World’ on 22 October 2018. Fender said the song was a celebration of music and a not-so-subtle middle finger to the naysayers that tend to rear their heads as soon as things start to work out for you, especially back home. He also said, "Music was always ever present when I was growing up, and it’s continued to be the most important and intrinsic part of me. It kept me from going off the rails as a kid and it gave me rare purpose and self-confidence that I couldn’t find from anything else. This song talks loosely about how susceptible you can become to negativity and jealousy, even when you’re at your happiest and most confident. It’s about finding strength to ignore it all, and keep doing your own thing."

Critical reception
Robin Murray from Clash gave the song a positive review stating, "Crisp power pop, it soars towards the crunching chorus, a real ear-worm that stays stuck in your head for days."

Music video
A music video to accompany the release of "That Sound" was first released onto YouTube on 15 November 2018.

Track listing

Charts

Certifications

Release history

References

2018 songs
Sam Fender songs
Polydor Records singles